Polychares was the name of several persons in ancient Greece:

Polychares (tyrant), one of the Thirty Tyrants of Athens
Polychares of Messenia, victor in the stadion race of the 4th Olympic Games in 764 BC